The Bismarck Larks are a collegiate summer baseball team that plays in the Northwoods League. Based in Bismarck, North Dakota, the Larks play their home games at Bismarck Municipal Ballpark.

History
On August 28, 2015, it was announced that the Northwoods League had agreed to terms for a team to begin play in Bismarck for 2017.  Said team officially began promotions on June 6, 2016, with the launch of the name-the-team contest, with Larks, Bullies and Flickertails being announced as the three finalists on July 29.

The Bismarck Larks name, logo and colors were officially unveiled on October 13.
In 2020, they are playing against two temporary teams (Bismarck Bull-Moose and Mandan Flickertails) in Bismarck with players from Thunder Bay Thunder Cats and other locations.

Larks in the Pros

References

External links
BismarckLarks official site
Northwoods League official site

Northwoods League teams
Amateur baseball teams in North Dakota
Sports in Bismarck, North Dakota
Baseball teams established in 2015
2015 establishments in North Dakota